Gilgit Airport  is a small domestic airport situated 1.25 nm (2.3 km) east of Gilgit, a city in the Gilgit-Baltistan territory of Pakistan. The city of Gilgit is one of the two major hubs for mountaineering expeditions in the northern areas of Pakistan.

Structure

Because of its short runway located at the edge of a slope, even Boeing 737s and similar-sized jet aircraft cannot operate at Gilgit Airport. Pakistan International Airlines operates ATR 42 aircraft on the Gilgit-Islamabad route. In the past, Fokker F-27 Friendships were used. Other aircraft that operate at the airport include the military Lockheed C-130 Hercules.

A new terminal was constructed in 2014 and inaugurated by Prime Minister Nawaz Sharif.

The airport was planned to be twice as extensive, but waterlogged ground led to half the land being instead used for a public park, CAA Park or City Park Gilgit.

Airlines and destinations

Due to the small size of the airport planes like ATR-42 and C-130 are able to safely land on this airport. Flights are scheduled mostly from Islamabad. However in 2022, PIA started flights from Karachi and Lahore through a stopover at Islamabad.

Accidents

 On August 25, 1989, Pakistan International Airlines Flight 404, a Fokker F27 carrying 54 people, disappeared after leaving Gilgit. The wreckage has not been found.
 On July 20, 2019, Pakistan International Airlines Flight 605, an ATR carrying 53 people, skidded off the runway and came to rest on the grass. All the passengers were evacuated safely, but the plane was damaged.

See also 
 List of airports in Pakistan
 Airlines of Pakistan
 Skardu International Airport
 Chilas Airfield
 Pakistan Civil Aviation Authority

References

External links
 

Airports in Gilgit-Baltistan